PKS 2131-021 is a blazar, a type of active galactic nucleus whose relativistic jet points in the direction toward the Earth. Its redshift is 1.285. Observations of its radio emission spanning a 45-year duration show epochs of periodic brightness variations. These nearly sinusoidal brightness changes have been interpreted as evidence of orbital motion of a binary black hole. The orbital separation of the two black holes is inferred to be 200 to 2000 AU.  The periodic variability in the light curve indicates that the pair orbit each other about every two years, at a distance so close that they will merge in about 10,000 years (as viewed from the Earth).

See also 
 Supermassive black hole
 NGC 7727
 OJ 287

References 

Blazars